Ilchester Place is a street in the Holland Park area of London.

It runs from Abbotsbury Road to Melbury Road, and houses on the north side of the street back onto Holland Park itself.

In December 2021, it was named the sixth most expensive street in the UK, with an average house price of £16.3 million.

References

Holland Park
Streets in the Royal Borough of Kensington and Chelsea
Garden squares in London
Squares in the Royal Borough of Kensington and Chelsea